Subtruck was a heavy groove rock band that was formed in 1998 in Perth, Western Australia by singer/guitarist Phil Bradley, previously of The Jackals.

Biography

Subtruck released their debut eponymous EP in 2000 before signing to Sic Squared Records in 2001. Their first album for Sic Squared Records, Songs to Whistle at War, was released in 2002, and lead to their inclusion on several compilations including 'Left of Centre 2', 'S.L.A.M. 2002' and 'Foot in the Door'.

2003 saw them support iconic Australian alternative acts The Mark of Cain and the Lime Spiders on the West Australian legs of their respective national tours.

The band released their second album Ballbaring in 2004 to much acclaim, including a spot in Triple J's 'Full Metal Racket' DJ Andrew Haug's Top 5 Releases for 2004, and a nomination for 'Best Heavy Rock Act' at the 2004 WAMi Awards. The band toured nationally twice in 2005 and was again nominated for 'Best Heavy Rock Act' at that year's WAMi Awards.

The band's last album Pig Iron was released on 25 March 2006, with the band releasing a limited home edition DVD Get Trucked in December 2006.

Line-up

 Phil Bradley – Vocals / guitar
 Kris Goodwin – Drums
 Robert Troup – Bass

Discography
 Subtruck (EP) – 2000
 Songs to Whistle at War – Sic Squared (2001)
 Ballbaring – Sic Squared (2004)
 Pig Iron – Sic Squared (2006)

External links
 Sic Squared Records website

Australian heavy metal musical groups
Musical groups established in 1998
Western Australian musical groups